Albius may refer to:

People of an Ancient Roman gens or cognomen
Albia gens
Juventinus Albius Ovidius
Albius Tibullus

Surname
Edmond Albius